The 2013 Team Long Track World Championship was the seventh annual FIM Team Long Track World Championship. The final took place on 18 August 2013 in Folkestone, England.

Results
  Folkestone
 18 August 2013

Scorers
Source:

See also
 2013 World Longtrack Championship
 2013 Speedway World Cup

References

Team Long Track World Championship
Team Long Track
Sport in Kent